Below is a list of international trips made by Andrzej Duda, the 6th and current President of Poland.

Number of visits
The number of visits per country where he travelled are:
 One visit to Afghanistan, Albania, Australia, Azerbaijan, Bosnia and Herzegovina, Canada, Cyprus, Denmark, Ethiopia, Finland, Israel, Ivory Coast, Japan, Jordan, Kazakhstan, Kuwait, Luxembourg, Mexico, Montenegro, the Netherlands, New Zealand, Nigeria, North Macedonia, Norway, Palestine, Senegal, South Korea, Spain, Sweden, Tajikistan, United Arab Emirates and Vietnam
 Two visits to China, Croatia, Egypt, Greece, Malta, Moldova, Qatar, Portugal, Slovenia and Turkey 
 Four visits to Latvia 
 Five visits to Bulgaria, Estonia, France, Georgia (country) and United Kingdom
 Six visits to Romania 
 Seven visits to Czech Republic, Hungary, Lithuania, Vatican and Switzerland 
 Eleven visits to Belgium, Germany, Italy and Slovakia
 Twelve visits to Ukraine
 Fourteen visits to the United States

2015

2016

2017

2018

2019

2020

2021

2022

2023

Planned

See also
 Foreign relations of Poland

References

Foreign relations of Poland
State visits by Polish leaders
Diplomatic visits by heads of state